Chemparathy is a 1972 Malayalam-language film directed by P. N. Menon and written by Malayattoor Ramakrishnan. It was produced by S. K. Nair (S. Krishnan Nair), a famous literary personality and the founder of Malayalanadu weekly. It stars Madhu along with newcomers Roja Ramani, Raghavan and Sudheer in major roles. The film was an adaptation of Malayattoor's short story Lodge. Noted filmmaker Bharathan made his cinematic debut as an art director in the film.

The film was a notable critical and commercial success upon release. The film won two awards at the inaugural Filmfare Awards South for Best Film - Malayalam and Best Actress - Malayalam. The film also won one Kerala State Film Award for Second Best Film. The film was remade in Tamil as Paruva Kaalam in 1974  with Roja Ramani repeating her role and Kamal Haasan playing the male lead and also in Telugu as Kanne Vayasu.

Plot summary

Santha (Roja Ramani) is a cheerful girl who is working in a lodge as a sweeper. She is favourite to everyone in the lodge. Dinesh (Raghavan) is in love with this girl. But one day Santha is found dead in the nearby well. Police start investigation and at first arrest Balachandran (Madhu) as suspect. But later Dinesh confess to police that Rajappan (Sudheer), a rich guy living in this same lodge is the reason for Santha’s death. Rajappan raped Santha and when she become pregnant he killed her. After Santha’s death her memories haunt Dinesh and he kills Rajappan and surrender to police .

Cast
 Madhu as Balachandran
 Raghavan as Dinesh
 Roja Ramani as Santha
 Sudheer as Rajappan
 Kottarakkara Sreedharan Nair as Sankaran
 Rani Chandra
 Adoor Bhavani as Santha's mother
 Sankaradi
 Adoor Bhasi as Bhasi
 Bahadoor
 Kuthiravattom Pappu
 Paravoor Bharathan
 Balan K. Nair
 Janardhanan
 Radhamani
 Sudharma
 Pathma
 P. O. Thomas
 Pathiyil Madhavan (guest)
 Vaidyar K. R. Velappan Pillai

Soundtrack

Awards

Filmfare Awards South 
Best Film - Malayalam - S. K. Nair
Best Actress - Malayalam - Roja Ramani, before the film released her screen name was Shobhana.

Kerala State Film Awards 

 Second Best Film - S. K. Nair and P. N. Menon

References

External links
 

Works by Malayattoor Ramakrishnan
1970s Malayalam-language films
Films shot in Kollam
Malayalam films remade in other languages
Films directed by P. N. Menon (director)